Luisinho is the diminutive of Luís, a Portuguese given name (in English language, Little Louis, in Italian language Luigino).

Notable people with the name include:

Sportspeople
 Luisinho (footballer, 1911-1983), Luís Mesquita de Oliveira, Brazilian football forward
 Luizinho (footballer, 1930-1998), Luiz Trochillo, Brazilian football attacking midfielder
 Luisinho Lemos (1951-2019), Luiz Alberto Silva Lemos, Brazilian football manager and former striker
 Luizinho (footballer, born 1958), Luiz Carlos Ferreira, Brazilian football defender
 Luisinho (footballer, born 1965), Luís Carlos Quintanilha, Brazilian football midfielder
 Luizinho (Angolan footballer) (born 1969), Luis Domingos Antonio Cazengue, Angolan football forward
 Luizinho Vieira (born 1972), Luiz Henrique Vieira, Brazilian manager and former midfielder
 Luisinho Dias (born 1973), Luís Germano Borlotes Dias, Mozambican football goalkeeper
 Luisinho Netto (born 1974), Luís Idorildo Netto da Cunha, Brazilian football right-back
 Luizinho (footballer, born 1977), Luiz Fernando Pontes Ribeiro, Brazilian football midfielder
 Luizinho Lopes (born 1981), Luiz Júnior de Souza Lopes, Brazilian football manager and former midfielder
 Luizinho (footballer, born 1982), Luiz Antônio de Oliveira, Portuguese football full-back
 Luisinho (footballer, born 1985), Luís Carlos Correia Pinto, Portuguese football left-back
 Luizinho (footballer, born 1985), Luís Carlos Fernandes, Brazilian football forward
 Luizinho (footballer, born 1987), Luiz Eduardo Amaral Serra Pereira, Brazilian football defensive midfielder
 Luisinho (footballer, born 1990), Luís Miguel Pinheiro Andrade, Portuguese football winger
 Luisinho (footballer, born 1991), Luis Gustavo Melere da Silva, Brazilian football winger
 Luizinho (footballer, born 1996), Luiz Henrique Alves Angelo, Brazilian football attacking midfielder
 Luisinho (footballer, born 1998), Luis Carlos dos Santos Amorim, Brazilian football midfielder

Other
 Luizinho Drummond (1940-2020), Luiz Pacheco Drummond, illegal lottery operator
 Luizinho Faleiro (born 1951), Indian National Congress politician from Goa